McCormick may refer to:

Business
 McCormick & Company, an American food company specializing in spices and flavorings
 McCormick & Schmick's, an American restaurant chain specializing in seafood
 McCormick Harvesting Machine Company, a manufacturer of the first mechanical reaper
 McCormick Distilling Company, an American distillery
 McCormick Tractors, a manufacturer of tractors, headquartered in Fabbrico, Italy

Education
 McCormick Observatory, at the University of Virginia
 McCormick Theological Seminary, a Presbyterian school of theology in Chicago, Illinois
 Robert R. McCormick School of Engineering and Applied Science, at Northwestern University, Evanston, Illinois

Places in the United States
 McCormick, Illinois
 McCormick, South Carolina
 McCormick, Washington
 McCormick Gap, a windgap in Virginia

People 

 McCormick (surname)

Sports
 McCormick Place, an exposition complex in Chicago, Illinois
 McCormick Field, a Minor League Baseball park in Asheville, North Carolina

Other uses
 McCormick Dam, a hydroelectric generating station in Baie-Comeau, Quebec
 McCormick Ranch, a planned community in Arizona
 USS McCormick (DD-223), a Clemson-class destroyer in the US Navy during World War II
 USS Lynde McCormick (DDG-8), a Charles F. Adams class guided missile destroyer launched in 1959
 Hardcastle and McCormick, a 1980s television series

See also
 McCormack
 Cormick (disambiguation)